John Morgan Bright (January 20, 1817October 2, 1911) was an American politician that served as an U.S. Representative from Tennessee.

Biography
Born in Fayetteville, Tennessee, Bright was the son of James and Nancy Morgan Bright. He attended the schools of Fayetteville and Bingham's School in Hillsboro, North Carolina. He graduated from Nashville University in September 1839. In March 1841 he graduated from the law department of Transylvania University, Lexington, Kentucky.

Bright first married Judith C. Clark and they had nine children, James Clark Bright, Golding Bright, W. C. Bright, Robert Lucius Bright, John Morgan Bright, Anna Mary Bright, Susan Catherine Bright, Judith Margaret Bright, and Samual A.Bright. He next married Zerilda B Buckner and they had four children, Anthoney Buckner Bright, David Mitchel Bright, Becham Bright and Mathew M Bright. His third marriage was to Isabella Buckner.

Career
Upon being admitted to the bar in 1841, Bright began his law practice in Fayetteville. He also served as a member of the Tennessee House of Representatives in 1847 and 1848. While in the Legislature he introduced and passed the bill providing for the construction of Tenn., Asylum for the Insane.

During the Civil War, he was Inspector General of Tennessee, with the rank of Brigadier General, and served on the staff of Governor Isham G. Harris from 1861 to 1865.

Elected as a Democrat to the Forty-second for the fourth district of Tennessee, Bright was re-elected to the four succeeding Congresses. The re-districting for the 44th Congress changed his representation to the fifth district. He served from March 4, 1871, to March 3, 1881. His first speech in the U. S. House of Representatives was against the Ku-Klux Bill. He served as chairman of the Committee on Claims (Forty-fourth through Forty-sixth Congresses), Committee on Expenditures in the Department of the Treasury (Forty-fourth Congress). He was an unsuccessful candidate for reelection in 1880 to the Forty-seventh Congress.

After leaving politics, Bright resumed the practice of law in Fayetteville.

Death
Bright died in Fayetteville on October 2, 1911, at the age of 94 years and 256 days. He is interred at the Presbyterian Churchyard, Fayetteville, Tennessee.

References

External links
 

1817 births
1911 deaths
Transylvania University alumni
Tennessee lawyers
Democratic Party members of the Tennessee House of Representatives
Democratic Party members of the United States House of Representatives from Tennessee
19th-century American politicians
People from Fayetteville, Tennessee
19th-century American lawyers